The 2006 Cronulla-Sutherland Sharks season was the 40th in the club's history. They competed in the 2006 National Rugby League season.

Season summary
The off-season was highlighted by the huge but controversial signing of former St. George Illawarra Dragons favourite Lance Thompson who was let go by the Dragons due to salary cap issues and in-fighting occurring at that club.

Following a first round bye, the Sharks had a slow start to the season before a win against the South Sydney Rabbitohs in round four appeared to get things going. There were mixed results throughout the season, including two wins against the previous year's grand finalists North Queensland and a home win against the St. George Illawarra Dragons (its first against them since 2002), however after its round 16 away win against the Newcastle Knights in Newcastle everything started to fall apart with the Sharks, seemingly on their way to the finals, losing their last nine matches of the season. By the season's end, the Sharks had fallen to 13th place (third-last) and coach Stuart Raper, knowing his time was up, was sacked. There were calls from passionate Sharks fans and the media for Ricky Stuart, at the time the Test coach who had also just been dismissed by the Sydney Roosters, to be installed as Cronulla coach. Ending months of speculation, Stuart was signed on as Sharks coach in the belief that the Sharks would once again return to the summit of the competition.

Ladder

Club Awards
Player of the year- Greg Bird
Chairman’s Award - Lance Thompson
Rookie of the Year - Luke Douglas 
Clubman of the Year - Luke Covell
Supporters Player of the Year – Paul Gallen
Premier League Player of the Year - Darren Mapp
Premier League Player’s Player – Luke Harlen
Jersey Flegg Player of the Year – Tu’u Maori
Jersey Flegg Best Forward – Leonard Ropeta

References

Cronulla-Sutherland Sharks seasons
Cronulla-Sutherland Sharks season